Unplugged is the second live album by Serbian and Yugoslav hard rock band Kerber, released in 1998. Originally released as two separate audio cassettes, the album was released on single CD in 1999.

Recording and release
The album was recorded on Kerber's unplugged concert held in Studio M in Novi Sad in January 1996. The album was originally released on two separate limited edition audio cassettes on Take It or Leave It Records in 1998. They contained the tracks "Nikad ponovo" ("Never Again") and "Svet se brzo okreće" ("The World Is Turning Fast"), which did not appear on the CD releases. In 1999, 13 songs from two audio cassettes were self-released by the band on CD. In 2006, Take It or Leave It reissued the CD with "Sutrašnji dan" ("Tomorrow's Day") as a bonus track.

Unplugged was the band's second and last album recorded with bass guitarist Saša Vasković, acoustic guitar player Vladan Stanojević and percussionist Goran Đorđević.

Track listing

Personnel
Goran Šepa - vocals
Tomislav Nikolić - guitar
Branislav Božinović - keyboards, producer
Saša Vasković - bass guitar
Josip Hartl - drums
Vladan Stanojević - acoustic guitar
Goran Đorđević - percussion

Guest musicians
Jelena - backing vocals, flute
Vesna - backing vocals
Emir - violin
Arabela - violin
Alma - violin
Nikola - violin
Silvija - viola
Jelena - cello
Marija - flute
Jan Šaš - producer

References

External links

Kerber live albums
1998 live albums
PGP-RTS live albums